The 2017 U Sports Women's Final 8 Basketball Tournament was held March 9–12, 2017, in Victoria, British Columbia. It was hosted by University of Victoria at the CARSA Performance Gym, which was the first time since 1993 that Victoria had hosted the tournament.

Participating teams

Championship Bracket

Consolation Bracket

See also 
2017 U Sports Men's Basketball Championship

References

External links 
 Tournament Web Site

U Sports Women's Basketball Championship
2016–17 in Canadian basketball
2017 in women's basketball
2017 in British Columbia